Calvin Ross Barnes (born January 14, 1988) is an American actor, director, screenwriter, film producer, novelist, and playwright. Barnes moved to Los Angeles in 2009, where he began his career by starring in short films, appearing in television commercials, and writing screenplays. His stage play, Rise, won Best World Premiere at the 2012 Hollywood Fringe Festival. In 2014, Barnes appeared in the Universal Studios horror film, Unfriended, which was executive produced by Jason Blum. He has two published novels, True Grandeur (2017), and the recently released Peter Pan sequel, Son of Neverland (2021), which he is also attached to star in. He stars in the upcoming feature film, The Astrid Experience, which marks his feature film directorial debut.

Early life and education
Cal Barnes was born in Salem, Oregon. He studied creative writing, journalism, and theatre at Portland State University before moving to Los Angeles. He is the great nephew of New York Mets baseball player, Lute Barnes.

Career 

Barnes started his acting career in 2010 when he began booking numerous short films he self-submitted for that filmed in and around Los Angeles. He began acting professionally in 2011 when he landed his first agent and began booking theatrical and commercial work. In late 2011, he moved to the Franklin Village neighborhood in the Hollywood Hills, where he began penning feature screenplays.

During his time in the village, Barnes penned his first play, Rise (2012), which went on to win Best World Premiere at the 2012 Hollywood Fringe Festival. He also wrote his first novel, True Grandeur, which chronicles the tale of Conrad Arlington, a young Hollywood hopeful that moves to Los Angeles to pursue his dream of becoming a great artist, all while managing his affections for Gracie Garrison, a young Hollywood it girl who takes an interest in him. In an interview regarding the novel, Barnes stated, "I was inspired by some experiences I had in my early twenties when I first moved to Los Angeles."

In 2013, he co-wrote the original screenplay for the independent feature drama, Adolescence. (2019), which premiered at the Grauman's Chinese Theatre on June 23, 2019. He also had a role in the successful horror film franchise, Unfriended (2014), which was produced by Timur Bekmambetov and Jason Blum, and released by Universal Studios.

Barnes recently starred in the upcoming feature film, The Astrid Experience (2020), opposite South African actress Lucia Xypteras. It marks Barnes's second collaboration with musician John That, the first being the music video Hippy Girl(2014), which Barnes directed. The Astrid Experience is Barnes's feature film debut as director.

On April 24, 2020, Barnes partnered with Wefunder to bring The Astrid Experience to the platform. The project was successfully funded on November 1, 2020.

On October 27, 2021, Barnes published his second novel, Son of Neverland, a Peter Pan sequel that takes place one hundred years into the future. The novel hit the #1 new release for mythology and folklore fantasy fiction on Amazon for the month of November, 2021. In honor of J.M. Barrie's legacy and support of children's hospitals, Barnes and the publisher set up a charitable fund to continue the endowment. On the official website and in the recitals of the novel Barnes and publisher state that "10% of the net proceeds from this book will go directly towards supporting children’s hospitals, charities, organizations, institutions, and causes worldwide that are designed to keep children safe, healthy, creative, imaginative, and ultimately make their lives better."

Between acting and filmmaking Barnes currently serves as the head of creative and CEO of Nineteen Films, a production and sales company in Los Angeles.

Appearances in other media 

In 2011, Barnes portrayed the teenage version of Jimmy "The Rev" Sullivan in the music video for the Avenged Sevenfold song "So Far Away", which served as a tribute video to the band's late drummer who passed in 2009. It is the band's first number one single.

As of August 2022, the video has over 300 million views on youtube.

Filmography

Films

Stage

Music videos

Books & Publications 
 True Grandeur: A Hollywood Novel (Magic Hour Press 2017) 
 Son of Neverland (Magic Hour Press 2021) 
 Rise (Prodigy Play Group 2022)

References

External links 
 
 

1988 births
American male actors
American film directors
Male actors from Salem, Oregon
Male actors from Los Angeles
American male screenwriters
American male novelists
Writers from Los Angeles
Living people
Portland State University alumni
Writers from Salem, Oregon